was a Japanese samurai of the Sengoku period who served the Sagara clan of southern Kyūshū and held the court title of . The lord of Akaike Castle in Higo Province, Akaike achieved fame at the fight at Ōkuchi Castle in 1568, when he defeated the forces of Shimazu Yoshihiro at the Battle of Dō-ga-saki.

References

1529 births
1568 deaths
Samurai
Sagara clan